Arturo Belleza Rotor (June 7, 1907 – April 9, 1988) was a Filipino medical doctor, civil servant, musician, and writer.

Medical and government career

Rotor was born in the Philippines and attended the University of the Philippines. He graduated simultaneously from the Conservatory of Music and the College of Medicine. He trained further at Johns Hopkins University's medical school, publishing a paper on a rare form of hyperbilirubinaemia (jaundice) now known as "Rotor syndrome".

During World War II, Rotor served as executive secretary of the Philippine Commonwealth government-in-exile under Manuel L. Quezon, the Philippine president in exile. In the immediate post-World War II period, he was appointed secretary of the Department of Health and Welfare. Later, Rotor was director of the University of the Philippines' Postgraduate School of Medicine and was a practising physician until the early 1980s.

Writing career

Rotor was an internationally respected writer of fiction and non-fiction in English. He is widely considered among the best Filipino short story writers of the twentieth century. He was a charter member of the Philippine Book Guild; the guild's initial publication (1937) was Rotor's The Wound and the Scar, despite Rotor's protests that someone else's work should have been selected. In 1966, the Philippine government recognized his literary accomplishments by awarding him the Republic Cultural Heritage Award.  Rotor's best-known literary works are The Wound and the Scar (1937), Confidentially, Doctor (1965), Selected Stories from the Wound and the Scar (1973), The Men Who Play God (1983), and the short stories "Dahong Palay" (1928) and "Zita" (1930).

Orchids
He was an orchid fancier and breeder, a long-time member of the Philippine Orchid Society, and is the namesake of a Vanda orchid species (Vanda merillii var. rotorii). Rotor shared an interest in orchids with his younger brother, Gavino B. Rotor Jr.  Gavino took this interest even further, receiving his Ph.D. from Cornell University on orchid biology and becoming an authority on orchid propagation.  The orchid genus Rotorara is named after Gavino.

Other interests

Rotor was a highly accomplished musician and published music critic.

Personal
Rotor died in 1988 from cancer and was survived by his wife Emma Unson, who taught college mathematics and physics. They had no children.

References

External links 

 Biography @ Whonamedit?
 Rotor's Syndrome @ Patient

An example of Rotor's writing, the short story "Zita", is available as part of The Best Philippine Short Stories:
 "Zita" text @ Sushidog

The Men Who Play God remains in print. It can be found on the website "A Critical Survey of Philippine Literature":
 "The Men Who Play God" archived @ the Wayback Machine

20th-century Filipino medical doctors
1988 deaths
1907 births
Executive Secretaries of the Philippines
Secretaries of Health of the Philippines
Secretaries of Social Welfare and Development of the Philippines
Quezon administration cabinet members
Osmeña administration cabinet members
University of the Philippines alumni
Johns Hopkins University alumni
Filipino expatriates in the United States